Armando da Silva Martins (born 4 March 1905, date of death unknown) was a Portuguese footballer. He played as forward.

International career
Martins made his international debut on 24 January 1926 in Porto against Czechoslovakia. The match ended in a 1-1 draw.

He gained 11 caps and scored 3 goals for the Portugal national team. Martins was also a member of the Portugal national squad in the 1928 football Olympic tournament, where he played 2 games.

References

External links
 
 
 

1905 births
Vitória F.C. players
Portugal international footballers
Portuguese footballers
Primeira Liga players
Footballers at the 1928 Summer Olympics
Year of death missing
Place of birth missing
Association football forwards
Olympic footballers of Portugal